Shallow Side is a rock band from Cullman, Alabama. Their song Can You Hear Me peaked at #34 on the US Billboard chart in May, 2017. The band spent 2018 on the Resurrection Tour with Puddle of Mudd, Saliva, Tantric, and The Veer Union.

Band Members 
Current members
 Eric Boatright - lead vocals
 Heath Fields - drums, backing vocals
 Seth Trimble - guitar, keyboard, backing vocals
 Sam Bower - bass, backing vocals

Former members
 Matthew Daniels - bass, backing vocals

Discography 
Studio Albums
Origins (2018)
Saints & Sinners (2019)

Extended Plays
 Home Today (2012)
 Stand Up (2014)
 One (2016)

Singles

Music videos

References 

Alternative rock groups from Alabama
American hard rock musical groups
American post-grunge musical groups